Elater is a genus of click beetle belonging to the family Elateridae.

Species
Species within this genus include:
 Elater abruptus Say, 1825 
 Elater acutus (Candèze, 1863) 
 Elater asmodaius Wurst, 1994 
 Elater ater (Candèze, 1865) 
 Elater decorus (Germar, 1843) 
 Elater dilaticollis (Fairmaire, 1883) 
 Elater ferrugineus Linnaeus, 1758 
 Elater georgelewisi (Suzuki, 1985) 
 Elater lecontei (Horn, 1871) 
 Elater magnicollis (Fleutiaux, 1918) 
 Elater niponensis (Lewis, 1894) 
 Elater pinguis (Horn, 1884) 
 Elater riesei Schimmel, 2007 
 Elater ruficollis (Solier, 1851) 
 Elater sakishimensis Ôhira, 1967 
 Elater solskyi (Suzuki, 1985) 
 Elater splendens Gurjeva, 1974 
 Elater tauricus (Schwarz, 1897) 
 Elater thoracicus (Fleutiaux, 1918)

References

Elaterinae
Beetles described in 1758
Taxa named by Carl Linnaeus